The Moscow Biennale of Contemporary Art is one of the most important Russian cultural events and was founded in 2003.

First Moscow Biennale of Contemporary Art 

The First Moscow Biennale of Contemporary Art (January 28 – February 28, 2005) caused great response both in Russia and abroad. The main exhibition  “Dialectics of Hope” included projects by 41 artists from 22 countries and represented art that focuses on one of the most fundamental experiences of a modern human being: hope. The main project was realised at the former Lenin Museum, near the Red Square. The Biennale's special projects and parallel program numbered over 50 exhibitions of Russian actual art as well as European, American and Asian visual artists. Curators (main project): Joseph Backstein, Daniel Birnbaum, Iara Boubnova, Nicolas Bourriaud, Rosa Martinez and Hans Ulrich Obrist.

Second Moscow Biennale of Contemporary Art 
The main project of the Second Moscow Biennale of Contemporary Art (March 1 – April 1, 2007)  titled “FOOTNOTES on Geopolitics, Market and Amnesia” showed works of 115 artists from 20 countries. Different curators and curatorial teams realized 5 exhibitions of the main project united by one theme. The project featured the exhibitions organized at various venues including The State Tretyakov Gallery, Moscow Contemporary Art Center Winzavod, Moscow Museum of Modern Art.

Exhibitions of the main project:
 Nothing but Footnotes? Art in the Epoch of Social Darwinism, Moscow-City, Federation Tower. Curator: Joseph Backstein.
 USA: American video art at the beginning of the 3rd Millennium, Shopping centre TsUM. Curators: Daniel Birnbaum, Gunnar B. Kvaran, Hans Ulrich Obrist.
 History in present tense. Moscow-City, Federation Tower. Curator: Iara Boubnova.
 Stock Zero, Or The Icy Water Of Egoistical Calculation, Moscow-City, Federation Tower. Curator: Nicolas Bourriaud.
 After all. Moscow-City, Federation Tower, State Schusev Museum of Architecture. Curators: Fulya Erdemci and Rosa Martinez.

Third Moscow Biennale of Contemporary Art 

The commissioner of the Biennale was Joseph Backstein. The exhibition program of the Third Moscow Biennale of Contemporary Art (September 24 - November 1, 2009) featured main project "Against exclusion" and more than 39 special projects and 7 special guests shows.

Main project "Against exclusion" 
The main project of Third Moscow Biennale of Contemporary Art entitled "Against exclusion" (curator Jean-Hubert Martin, best known for his exhibition "Magiciens de la terre" at the Centre Pompidou, Paris, 1989) was held at the Garage Center for Contemporary Culture (now known as Garage Museum of Contemporary Art) and was presenting artists from Russia, Europe, United States, Asia, South America, Africa and Oceania. French curator Jean-Hubert Martin mixed the work of well-known contemporary western artists with non-western and non-professional artists. He was assisted by Exhibition Designer and Dutch Curator Mattijs Visser and French Curator Oliver Varenne.
.

Special guests shows 

The Special Guest program represent personal exhibitions of the important figures of the modern art scene.
 Olga Chernysheva, Russia. "Present - Past", Baibakov Art Projects, Red October (former chocolate factory)
 Antony Gormley, Great Britain. "Domain Field", The Garage Center for Contemporary Culture (July 16 – September 2, 2009)
 Michail Grobman, Israel. "The Metamorphoses of Collage", Moscow Museum of Modern Art
 Bertrand Lavier, France. AFTERMOON
 Atelier Van Lieshout, Netherlands. "Slave City", Moscow Contemporary Art Center WINZAVOD
 Vladimir Tarasov, Russia. "Sound Games", Multimedia Art Museum
 Luc Tuymans, Belgium. "Against the Day", Baibakov Art Projects, Red October (former chocolate factory)

Special projects

Parallel program 
There was also a parallel program of exhibitions at Triumph Gallery, Winzavod, Zverev Center of Contemporary Art, Moscow Museum of Modern Art, The Lumiere Brothers Photogallery, The State Literary Museum, One Spectator's Gallery, Praktika Theater, Pop/off/art Gallery, Regina Gallery, RuArts Gallery, State Museum of Alexander Pushkin, Design center ARTPLAY, State Museum of Contemporary Arts of the Russian Academy of Arts, The State Literary Museum, Fine Art Gallery, Kino Gallery, Instituto Cervantes de Moscu, Open Gallery, Vostochnaya gallery, The State Literary Museum, Aidan Gallery, Proekt Fabrika, Ravenscourt Galleries, Russian Academy of Arts, Red October, Petr Vois Gallery, Photographer.ru, Moscow Zoo (Exhibition Hall), State Tretyakov Gallery, VP Studio, Kovcheg Gallery, State Museum of Contemporary Arts of the Russian Academy of Arts, ARTPLAY, Schusev State Museum of Architecture, Elena Vrublevskaya Gallery, National Centre for Contemporary Arts, XL Gallery, GP, Arka Gallery (ЦЕХ V), Pobeda Gallery, Krokin Gallery, L-gallery, and M&J Guelman Gallery.

Fourth Moscow Biennale of Contemporary Art 
The curator of the Fourth Moscow Biennale of Contemporary Art will be Peter Weibel, curator, artist, theorist of media arts and director of the Center of Art and Media Technology (ZKM) in Karlsruhe (Germany). Fourth Moscow Biennale of Contemporary Art will take place in September–October 2011. Commissioner and the artistic director of the Biennale will be Joseph Backstein.

External links 
 Neue Review, "The First Moscow Biennale of Contemporary Art (Exhib. Review)"
 Second Moscow Biennale of Contemporary Art
 Third Moscow Biennale of Contemporary Art
 Fourth Moscow Biennale of Contemporary Art
 Frieze Magazine, "3rd Moscow Biennale"
 Art Margins, "The 3rd Moscow Biennale of Contemporary Art (Exhib. Review)"
 Artupdate, 'List of participating artists in 5th Moscow Biennale announced Summer 2013'

Russian art
Art biennials
Recurring events established in 1995